{{Infobox award|name=SIIMA Award for Best Female Playback Singer – Telugu|awardname=SIIMA Award for Best Female Playback Singer – Telugu – Telugu|country=India|presenter=Vibri Media Group|producer=Vibri Media Group|awarded_for=Best Singing by a female playback singer in a Telugu song|established=2012|year=2012|holder=Madhu Priya for "He's So Cute" from Sarileru Neekevvaru|image=|image caption=Shreya Ghoshal, the most nominated singer for the award|most_wins=Madhu Priya – 2|most_nominations=Shreya Ghoshal – 10|total_recipients=10 (as of 2021)}}

SIIMA Award for Best Female Playback Singer – Telugu is presented by Vibri media group as part of its annual South Indian International Movie Awards, for the best singing by a female playback singer/vocalist of a Telugu-language song. The award was first given in 2012 for songs and films released in 2011.

 Superlatives 

 Winners 

 Nominations 

 2011: Shreya Ghoshal – "Chali Chaliga" from Mr. Perfect Sunidhi Chauhan – "Nath Nath" from Badrinath Swathi Reddy – "A Square B Square" from 100% Love Nithya Menen – "Ammammo Ammo" from Ala Modalaindi Malavika – "Amma Avanee" from Rajanna 2012: Geetha Madhuri – "Melikalu" from Cameraman Gangatho Rambabu
 Shreya Ghoshal – "Sai Andri Nanu Sai Antira" from Krishnam Vande Jagadgurum Mamta Sharma – "Kevvu Keka" from Gabbar Singh Malathi – "Orinayano" from Rebel Suchitra – "Sir Osthara" from Businessman 2013: Chithra – "Seethamma Vakitlo" from Seethamma Vakitlo Sirimalle Chettu
 Shreya Ghoshal – "Hey Naayak" from Naayak Suchitra – "Diamond Girl" from Baadshah Geetha Madhuri– "Top Lesi Poddi" from Iddarammayilatho 2014: Neha Bhasin – "Aww Thujo Mogh Korta" from 1: Nenokkadine
 Shreya Ghoshal – "Chinni Chinni Aasalu" from Manam Shreya Ghoshal – "Nee Jathaga Nenundali" from Yevadu K. S. Chithra– "Gopikamma" from Mukunda Chinmayi – "Vaddantune" from Run Raja Run 2015: Satya Yamini – "Mamathala Thalli" from Baahubali: The Beginning Shreya Ghoshal – "Nijamenani Nammani" from Kanche Chinmayi – "Vennellona Mounam" from Surya vs Surya Priya Himesh – "Gathama Gathama" from Malli Malli Idi Rani Roju Ramya Behara– "Dheevara" from Baahubali: The Beginning 2016: Ramya Behara – "Rang De" from A Aa
 Geetha Madhuri – "Pakka Local" from Janatha Garage Padmalatha – "Chusa Chusa" from Dhruva Sameera Bharadwaj – "Telusa Telusa" from Sarrainodu Uma Neha – "Tikku Tikkantu" from Babu Bangaram 2017: Madhu Priya – "Vacchinde" from Fidaa Geetha Madhuri / M. M. Manasi – "Mahanubhavudu" from Mahanubhavudu Neha Bhasin – "Swing Zara" from Jai Lava Kusa Sony – "Hamsa Naava" from Baahubali 2: The Conclusion Uma Neha – "Paisa Vasool" from Paisa Vasool 2018: M. M. Manasi – "Rangamma Mangamma" from Rangasthalam Chinmayi – "Yenti Yenti" from Geetha Govindam Shreya Ghoshal – "Allasani Vari" from Tholi Prema Shreya Gopuraju – "Tik Tik Tik" from Savyasachi Sunitha Upadrashta – "Chivaraku Migiledi" from Mahanati2019: Chinmayi – "Priyathama Priyathama" from Majili Mangli – "Bullet Song" from George Reddy
 Shreya Ghoshal & Sunidhi Chauhan– "Sye Raa Title Song" from Sye Raa Narasimha Reddy Mohana Bhogaraju, Hari Teja & Satya Yamini – "Oo Bava" from Prati Roju Pandage Yamini Ghantasala – "Gira Gira" from Dear Comrade 2020: Madhu Priya – "He's So Cute" from Sarileru Neekevvaru Chinmayi – "Oohale" from Jaanu
 Spoorthi – "Unipova" from Savaari
 Shreya Ghoshal – "Vastunna Vachestunna" from V
 Ramya Behara – "Ekaantham" from Colour Photo''
 2021: Geetha Madhuri – "Jai Balayya" from Akhanda
 Mangli – "Saranga Dariya" from Love Story
 Mounika Yadav – "Saami Saami" from Pushpa: The Rise
 Indravathi Chauhan – "Oo Antava Oo Oo Antava" from Pushpa: The Rise
 Shreya Ghoshal – "Jala Jala Jalapaatham Nuvvu" from Uppena

References 

South Indian International Movie Awards
Indian music awards
Music awards honoring women